University High School is a public, four-year high school located in Orange City, Florida, United States. Established in 2010, it is the newest high school established in Volusia County since 1994, as well as its costliest. As of 2010, it was the largest high school in Volusia County by enrollment.

The new school opened on August 16, 2010. About 500 students at the new high school come from DeBary, about 500 from Orange City, another 250 from the unincorporated area around Orange City, and about 900 from Deltona. The school did not have a senior class for its 2010–2011 school year. The school has an elaborate advanced-placement program.

University High School is partnering with the University of Central Florida, Stetson University, and Embry Riddle Aeronautical University in sponsoring two academies, the STEM Academy (Science, Technology, Engineering, and Mathematics), and the Academy of Finance. Stetson has an advisory role in the program. For the 2016–2017 school year, University High School had 2,824 students enrolled.

See also

 List of high schools in Florida

References

External links
 , the school's official website

2010 establishments in Florida
Educational institutions established in 2010
High schools in Volusia County, Florida
Orange City, Florida
Public high schools in Florida